ORP Warszawa (formerly the Soviet Smely) was a large guided missile destroyer of the Polish Navy, one of the last ships of the modified Kashin class.

History 
From 1970 to 2003, the Polish Navy operated two guided-missile destroyers, which were little known. Although not modern ships, even by 1970s and 1980s standards, these vessels were one of the few classes of surface-to-air missile (SAM)-armed naval vessels operating in the Baltic Sea that were not operated by the Soviet Union for a significant portion of the Cold War. The decommissioning of the Project 61MP-class destroyer ORP Warszawa in 2003 marked the end of the Polish Navy's 73-year run of destroyer operations.

In 1970, the Polish Navy received a single Project 56AE destroyer (NATO designation: Kotlin-class) from the Soviet Union. The Polish Navy became the third Baltic navy to operate a ship armed with SAMs after the Soviet and West German navies. The ship was acquired secondhand from the Soviet Navy, which operated it for more than a dozen years under the name Spravedlivy ("Just"). The ORP Warszawa I, based on the M-1 Volna SAM system (a navalized version of the land-based S-125), provided air defense to the Polish Navy until its decommissioning in 1986.

Negotiations for a replacement vessel had already begun with the Soviet Union at the time. However, it would be another two years before the Polish Navy could officially replace the ORP Warszawa I with the leased Project 61MP-class destroyer (NATO designation: Mod Kashin-class) ORP Warszawa II. The ORP Warszawa II, first commissioned by the Soviet Navy as the Smely ("Bold") in 1969, was the Polish Navy's first true multi-role surface combatant. The ORP Warszawa II was a menacing sight to behold from any angle, with two double-barreled 76mm AK-276 guns, two M-1 Volna SAM launchers, four P-15 anti-ship missiles (AShMs) and four 30mm AK-630 CIWS, as well as 533mm torpedoes and two RBU-6000 ASW rocket launchers.

Though neither the ORP Warszawa I or ORP Warszawa II were particularly modern by the time they entered service with the Polish Navy, they nonetheless represent an interesting and important chapter of Polish Navy history, protecting its maritime interests in the Baltic Sea from 1970 until 2003. Larger and more capable than any other vessel ever operated by a Warsaw Pact member other than the Soviet Union, the Warszawas embodied Poland's desire to operate destroyer-class vessels, a continuation of a tradition that was founded in the 1930s.

ORP Warszawa I 
The ORP Warszawa I, on the other hand, appears positively tame. Originally intended as an ASW destroyer class, the Soviet Navy retrofitted seven Kotlin-class ships with SAMs throughout the 1960s. Another ship was altered and sold to Poland (Project 56AE, being the only Project 56 destroyer exported). The Warszawa replaced the two Project 30bis destroyers (Skory-class) Wicher and Grom, as well as the pre-WWII British-built ORP Byskawica, which was involved in a 1967 accident that rendered her immobile. The Byskawica was later relegated to the role of floating anti-aircraft battery before being officially retired in 1976, forty years after her launch. She became a museum ship in 1976, a role she still plays today.

While the ORP Byskawica was still limited to 100mm and 37mm AA guns, its replacement, the ORP Warszawa I, was the first to introduce a surface-to-air missile capability to the Polish Navy's inventory in the form of the M-1 Volna SAM system. The M-1 is a rail-based missile launcher capable of launching two V-600/601 missiles at air targets (or, in an emergency, ships) up to a range of 15 kilometers. The M-1 Volna's development began in 1956, along with work on a land-based version (which ultimately became the ubiqitous S-125). Only one target can be engaged at a time (or two for ships equipped with two M-1 Volnas), reducing the system's effectiveness significantly. The system can carry up to 32 reloads, and several upgrade projects eventually increased the system's range to 22km when using the V-601(M) missile.

The ORP Warszawa I was equipped with two RBU-2500 ASW rocket launchers, a 1x5 533mm torpedo launcher, and a defensive armament suite consisting of two 130mm SM-2-1 dual-purpose cannons mounted in a turret and one 1x4 45mm SM-20-ZiF anti-aircraft gun system. The ship lacked the four 30mm AK-230 anti-aircraft guns found on Soviet ships of the same class. During her sixteen-year service (1970-1986), the ORP Warszawa I fired 28 V-601 SAMs (more than half of the missiles purchased by the Polish Navy) and visited the Soviet Union, Finland, Sweden, Denmark, the United Kingdom, and France.

ORP Warszawa II 
The ORP Warszawa II greatly expanded on its predecessor's capabilities from the 1950s by adding a second M-1 Volna SAM launcher, four P-15 AShMs, CIWS, improved ASW equipment, and the ability to carry a helicopter. After the lease on the Warszawa II expired, it was permanently transferred to Poland in 1993 to pay Russian debts incurred during the Soviet era. That same year, the destroyer began a two-year overhaul, which included the replacement of Soviet navigation radars with Polish ones. Despite speculation about replacing the ship's aging weapons systems and building a permanent hangar for the W-3 helicopter carried onboard, a chronic lack of funds meant that no major modernization was ever carried out.

Due to a lack of funds, the ORP Warszawa II only sailed on a sporadic basis after the Cold War ended. The very weapons systems that had originally prompted the ship's purchase were now difficult and expensive to maintain. The vessel took part in only one of the major international exercises that took place in the Baltic Sea during the 1990s and early 2000s. The destroyer was officially decommissioned from the fleet on December 1, 2003, pending a sale abroad. In the end, no country was interested, so the ship was placed in reserve before being scrapped and broken up by the Gdansk Shipyard in 2005. The ORP Warszawa II in Polish service fired 48 V-601 SAMs and eight P-15 AShMs.

The ORP Warszawa II was eventually replaced by two secondhand Oliver Hazard Perry class frigates acquired from the US Navy. Despite their smaller size, one could argue that they provided the Polish Navy with a more capable (though less menacing-looking) platform. The Perry class will be replaced by three indigenous Miecznik-class frigates, which will be the most capable vessels the Polish Navy has ever operated. Despite the fact that they are no longer true destroyers, these ambitious successors will unquestionably carry on a proud tradition.

India's Kashin-class destroyers 
Despite being designed in the late 1950s, the ORP Warszawa II's brethren are still in service, with three heavily modified Mod Kashin-class destroyers still in service with the Indian Navy, which received five vessels in the early to late 1980s. In Indian service, the remaining three vessels are known as the Rajput-class, and India has invested significant resources in keeping them relevant in 21st-century warfare. Two of the ships have been upgraded to carry eight BrahMos AShMs instead of the four P-15 Styx launchers that were previously installed. On two ships, the aft M-1 Volna SAM launcher was replaced by two 8-cell VLS for the Israeli Barak 1 SAM and a 16-cell VLS for the SAM VL-SRSAM. One of the ships has also been used to test the Dhanush (anti-ship) ballistic missile. A plan to replace the Rajput-propulsion class's with an indigenously designed gas turbine engine could mean that these ships will remain in service for many years to come.

Notes

References

Kashin-class destroyers of the Soviet Navy
Ships built in the Soviet Union
1968 ships
Kashin-class destroyers of the Polish Navy
Cold War destroyers of the Soviet Union
Cold War destroyers of Poland